Michael Joseph Green (October 13, 1917 – August 30, 1982) was a 20th-century bishop of the Catholic Church in the United States.  He served as the third bishop of the Diocese of Reno in the state of Nevada from 1967 to 1974.

Biography
Born in St. Joseph, Michigan, Green was ordained a Catholic priest for the Diocese of Lansing on July 14, 1946.  On June 22, 1962 Pope John XXIII named him the Titular Bishop of Trisipa and Auxiliary Bishop of Lansing. He was consecrated a bishop on August 28, 1962, by Bishop Joseph H. Albers of Lansing.  The co-consecrators were Bishops Clarence George Issenmann of Columbus and Charles Salatka auxiliary bishop of Grand Rapids.  From 1962 to 1965 he attended all four sessions of the Second Vatican Council.  On March 11, 1967, Pope Paul VI named him as the third bishop of Reno.  He served the diocese for seven years until his resignation was accepted by Pope Paul on December 6, 1974.

References

1917 births
1982 deaths
People from St. Joseph, Michigan
Roman Catholic Diocese of Lansing
Roman Catholic bishops of Reno
20th-century Roman Catholic bishops in the United States
Participants in the Second Vatican Council
Religious leaders from Michigan
Catholics from Michigan